In Irish mythology Medb Lethderg ("red-side") was a goddess of sovereignty associated with Tara. She was the wife or lover of nine successive kings, including Fedlimid Rechtmar, Art mac Cuinn and Cormac mac Airt.

She is probably identical with or the inspiration for Medb of the Connachta in the Ulster Cycle (Byrne 2001).

The poem "Macc Moga Corbb celas clú" in the Book of Leinster is ascribed to her.

She is associated with Rath Meave, south of the Hill of Tara.

References
 Byrne, Francis John, Irish Kings and High-Kings. Four Courts Press. 2nd edition, 2001.

Irish goddesses
Cycles of the Kings
Irish poets
Irish women poets